Raymond is a city in Hinds County, Mississippi, United States. As of the 2010 census, the city population was 1,933; in 2020, its population was 1,960. Raymond is one of two county seats of Hinds County (along with Jackson) and is the home of the main campus of Hinds Community College. Raymond is part of the Jackson metropolitan statistical area.

History
In 1829, three commissioners, including John B. Peyton, were appointed by U.S. President Andrew Jackson to find a place near the center of Hinds County for the county seat. The current location of Raymond is a ridge about a mile from the center of the county, and was selected because the actual center was low and subject to flooding. The town of Raymond received its charter from the Mississippi legislature on December 15, 1830. Because of its status as a seat of justice and its proximity to the Natchez Trace, Raymond developed quickly into a prosperous small town whose prosperity and small size have continued to this day.

In the late 1840s, Cooper's Well, a property near Raymond with a well that provided sulphured water, was developed into a resort for those seeking the perceived health benefits from its ingestion.

Construction of a new county courthouse was begun at the center of the town square in 1857 and completed in 1859; the work was largely done by enslaved African Americans. The courthouse is still in use as a secondary location of county legal matters (the city of Jackson having become the primary county seat). The Raymond courthouse is considered by many  to be a prime example of southern Greek Revival architecture.

The Battle of Raymond was fought by Confederate and Union soldiers near Raymond on May 12, 1863 as part of General Ulysses S. Grant's Vicksburg Campaign during the Civil War. Four days later, the pivotal Battle of Champion Hill was won by Grant's troops and sealed the fate of Vicksburg. Grant stayed at Waverly, the plantation of John B. Peyton, and Union soldiers used St. Mark's Episcopal Church as a hospital. Blood stains can still be seen on the church's floor from that period.

Construction of a water tower was begun in 1903 in the center of the town square. It and the courthouse are landmarks for the town. A small agricultural high school was opened in 1917; it developed as Hinds Community College, which has several sites and the largest student body of any college in the state.

Geography

Demographics

As of the 2020 United States census, there were 1,960 people, 361 households, and 202 families residing in the city.

Government and infrastructure
The United States Postal Service operates the Raymond Post Office.

The Mississippi Department of Human Services operates the Oakley Training School in unincorporated Hinds County, near Raymond.

Education
Hinds Community College has a Raymond campus.

Residents are within the Hinds County School District, and are zoned to Raymond Elementary School, Carver Middle School, and Raymond High School.

Jackson Hinds Library System operates the Raymond Public Library at the Hinds Courthouse annex.

Notable people
 Willie Banks, gospel music singer
 Cory Carter, American football punter
 Stephen Head, Major League Baseball scout
 George Caldwell Granberry, former state legislator who served as postmaster of Raymond
 Rick Lawson, gospel music singer
 Muna Lee, Pan-American poet and first wife of Luis Muñoz Marín (first democratically elected governor of Puerto Rico).
 Kansas Joe McCoy, Delta blues singer
 D. P. Porter, 25th Secretary of State of Mississippi
 Susan Dabney Smedes, teacher and author
 Jeremy Williams, American player of Canadian football
 John Bell Williams, governor of Mississippi from 1968 to 1972, was born in Raymond; he formerly served in the United States House of Representatives.

Gallery

References

External links

 City website
 History of Raymond, Mississippi

 
Cities in Mississippi
Cities in Hinds County, Mississippi
County seats in Mississippi
Populated places established in 1829
1829 establishments in Mississippi